Season four of Dancing with the Stars premiered on March 19, 2007, on the ABC network.

To avoid direct competition with Fox's American Idol, Dancing with the Stars changed time slots from the previous season. This season, the performance show aired on Mondays and the results show aired on Tuesdays. No elimination took place the first week in order to allow viewers two weeks to see all of the couples perform both Latin and ballroom dances. This season was broadcast on BBC One in the United Kingdom on Sunday afternoons.

On May 22, Olympic short-track speed skater Apolo Anton Ohno and Julianne Hough were crowned the champions, while NSYNC singer Joey Fatone and Kym Johnson finished in second place, and boxer Laila Ali and Maksim Chmerkovskiy finished third.

Cast

Couples
The cast consisted of eleven couples. Actor Vincent Pastore was originally announced and partnered with Edyta Śliwińska, but pulled out after one week of rehearsals. He was replaced by John Ratzenberger. 

Future appearances
Apolo Anton Ohno and Joey Fatone returned for the All-Stars season, where Fatone was again paired with Kym Johnson and Ohno with Karina Smirnoff.

Hosts and judges
Tom Bergeron and Samantha Harris returned as co-hosts, while Carrie Ann Inaba, Len Goodman, and Bruno Tonioli returned as judges.

Scoring charts

Notes

 : This was the lowest score of the week.
 : This was the highest score of the week.
 :  This couple finished in first place.
 :  This couple finished in second place.
 :  This couple finished in third place.
 :  This couple was in the bottom two, but was not eliminated.
 :  This couple was eliminated.

Highest and lowest scoring performances 
The highest and lowest performances in each dance according to the judges' 30-point scale are as follows.

Couples' highest and lowest scoring dances
Scores are based upon a potential 30-point maximum.

Weekly scores
Individual judges' scores in the charts below (given in parentheses) are listed in this order from left to right: Carrie Ann Inaba, Len Goodman, Bruno Tonioli.

Week 1
Each couple performed either the cha-cha-cha or the foxtrot. Couples are listed in the order they performed.

Week 2
Each couple performed either the mambo or the quickstep. Couples are listed in the order they performed.

Week 3
Each couple performed either the jive or the tango. Couples are listed in the order they performed.

Week 4
Each couple performed either the paso doble or the waltz. Couples are listed in the order they performed.

Week 5
Each couple performed either the rumba or the samba. Couples are listed in the order they performed.

Week 6
Each couple performed one unlearned dance and a swing group dance. Couples are listed in the order they performed.

Week 7
Each couple performed two unlearned dances. Couples are listed in the order they performed.

Week 8
Each couple performed two unlearned dances. Couples are listed in the order they performed.

Week 9
Each couple performed two dances. Couples are listed in the order they performed.

Week 10
Each couple performed two dances, plus a freestyle. Couples are listed in the order they performed.

Dance chart
The celebrities and professional partners danced one of these routines for each corresponding week:
 Week 1: One unlearned dance (cha-cha-cha or foxtrot)
 Week 2: One unlearned dance (mambo or quickstep)
 Week 3: One unlearned dance (jive or tango)
 Week 4: One unlearned dance (paso doble or waltz)
 Week 5: One unlearned dance (rumba or samba)
 Week 6: One unlearned dance & group swing dance
 Week 7: Two unlearned dances
 Week 8: Two unlearned dances
 Week 9: One unlearned dance & redemption dance
 Week 10 (Night 1): Redemption dance & freestyle
 Week 10 (Night 2): Favorite dance of the season

Notes

 :  This was the highest scoring dance of the week.
 :  This was the lowest scoring dance of the week.
 :  This couple danced, but received no scores.

References

External links

Dancing with the Stars (American TV series)
2007 American television seasons